The Brazilian martial art of capoeira, noted for its acrobatic movements and kicks, has often been featured in and influenced popular culture.

Films
Capoeira and capoeira mestres have been featured in several Brazilian films and documentaries including:

 Cordão de Ouro (1977), a futuristic Brazilian movie, stars several well-known Mestres, such as Nestor Capoeira and Mestre Camisa.
 Capoeira of Brazil (1980) is a documentary short by Warrington Hudlin, featuring Mestres Jelon Vieira, Loremil Machado and Eusebio da Silva.
 Mestre Bimba: A Capoeira Illuminada (2006) is a documentary about Mestre Bimba and capoeira.
 BESOURO (2009) is based on the story of a legendary fighter and practitioner in Capoeira history who goes by the same name as the title starring Aílton Carmo as Besouro. It includes extensive capoeira fighting scenes.

Capoeira has been a focus of several martial arts films, including:

 Rooftops (1989), a film featuring two homeless teenagers who use dance fights inspired by capoeira to settle arguments and as a form of entertainment.
 Only the Strong (1993), a film following a former Green Beret turned teacher in Miami who uses capoeira to teach his students discipline and ultimately faces off with the local gang. It is considered the only Hollywood film to focus entirely on capoeira. Much of the film's fight choreography was created by Mestre Amen Santo.
 Kickboxer 4: The Aggressor (1994) which featured a tournament with fighters of many styles, including a capoeirista played by Mestre Amen Santo.
The Quest (1996), a martial arts tournament film featured a capoeirista played by Mestre Cesar Carneiro.
Other films featuring capoeira include:
 Many of Wesley Snipes' action films include scenes involving capoeira, as it is one of several martial arts he practices.
 In the Marvel Cinematic Universe, capoeira is one of several African martial arts that T'Challa utilizes in combat.

Video games
Fighting games that feature capoeira fighters or fighting styles include:
The Tekken series features capoeiristas Eddy Gordo and Christie Monteiro. Both characters have been well received, and have been credited with popularizing capoeira to a wider audience.
 The Street Fighter III series feature the capoeirista Elena. Elena, an African woman, was envisioned to have long arms and legs, and capoeira was chosen as a suitable fighting style for her.
 The Fatal Fury series features two capoeira fighters, Richard Meyer and Bob Wilson.
 Zone 4, an online martial arts game, includes capoeira as a playable fighter's type.
Other games featuring capoera include:
 Martial Arts: Capoeira, is a 2011 RPG action game focused on capoera.
 In the mobile game Crossy Road, a playable capoeira fighter was added in a Brazil-themed update. The character navigates through the streets of Rio de Janeiro with acrobatic flips.
 In Overwatch, Lucio, a music star from Brazil, has a skin where he performs a dance move based on capoeira.

Music 
 The music video for "The Obvious Child" by Paul Simon features capoeira. This was the first single from Simon's album The Rhythm of the Saints, released in 1990.
 The 2006 music video for "Mas Que Nada" by the Black Eyed Peas and Sérgio Mendes features several scenes of capoeiristas along with various Brazilian dance forms, and Professor Marcinho playing.
 The music video of the song 'Roots Bloody Roots' by Brazilian metal band Sepultura features several shots of capoeira.

Anime
Anime series that feature capoeira include:
 In the 2021 anime series Odd Taxi, Miho Shirakawa displays her limited knowledge of capoeira, to the dismay of protagonist Hiroshi Odokawa. Later, Shirakawa uses the martial art to rescue Odokawa from an attacker.

Other influence
Breakdancing, developed in the 1970s, has many analogous moves. However, the original breakdancers of the early 1970s based their style primarily on actors in Asian kung fu films, but received some influence because demonstrations of capoeira master Jelon Vieira in New York.

Kofi Kingston, a WWE professional wrestler, has incorporated wrestling moves inspired by Tekken capoeira fighter Eddy Gordo.

Season 1, episode 4 of Bob's Burger's prominently features Capoeira

References

Popular culture
Topics in popular culture